The 2011–12 Liga Panameña de Fútbol season is the 24th season of top-flight football in Panama. The season began on 15 July 2011 and ended in May 2012 with Chepo winning the final. Ten teams completed throughout the season.

Teams
Atlético Veragüense finished in 10th place in the overall table last season and were relegated to the Liga Nacional de Ascenso. Taking their place for this season are the overall champions of last season's Liga Nacional de Ascenso, Colón C-3.

Managerial changes

2011 Apertura
The 2011 Apertura is the first tournament of the season. It began on 15 July 2011 and ended in December 2011.

First round

Standings

Results

Final round

Semi-finals

First leg

Second leg

Chorillo advances 3–2 on aggregate.

Plaza Amador advances 5–3 on aggregate.

Finals

Top goalscorers

2012 Clausura
The 2012 Clausura is the second tournament of the season. It began in January 2012 and ended in May 2012.

First round

Standings

Results

Final round

Semi-finals

First leg

Second leg

Final

Top goalscorers

Aggregate table

References

Liga Panameña de Fútbol seasons
1
Pan